Exercise bulimia is a subset of the psychological disorder called bulimia in which a person is compelled to exercise in an effort aimed at burning the calories of food energy and fat reserves to an excessive level that negatively affects their health. The damage normally occurs through not giving the body adequate rest for athletic recovery compared to their exercise levels, leading to increasing levels of disrepair. If the person eats a normally healthy and adequate diet but exercises in levels they know require higher levels of nutrition, this can also be seen as a form of anorexia.

Symptoms 

Exercise Bulimia can sometimes go unnoticed because exercise is something that is seen as healthy, but just because a person looks healthy does not mean they are. Compulsive exercisers will often schedule their lives around exercise just as those with eating disorders schedule their lives around eating (or not eating). Other indications of compulsive exercise are:
Missing work, school and other important events in order to work out
Working out with an injury or while sick
Working out secretly or away from noticeable sight
Becoming unusually depressed if unable to exercise
Working out for hours at a time each day
Not taking any rest or recovery days
Defining self-worth in terms of performance
Justifies excessive behavior by defining self as a "special" elite athlete
Depression or agitation when unable to work out
Amenorrhea, the stop of a woman's menstrual cycle
Isolation from others while working out
Lack of interest in friends and eating
Lack of sleep

See also 
Overtraining
Anorexia athletica

Notes

References 
About.com Exercise & Eating 
Activity Disorders 
Culture-bound syndromes
Eating disorders
Physical exercise